William Hodgkinson may refer to:
 William Hodgkinson (politician), Australian explorer, journalist, gold miner, and politician
 William Hodgkinson (footballer), English footballer
 William Wadsworth Hodkinson, American film distributor and movie theater owner
 W. W. Hodkinson Corporation

See also
 Will Hodgkinson, English journalist and author